Akashiba Dam is a gravity dam located in Yamagata Prefecture in Japan. The dam is used for power production. The catchment area of the dam is 736.8 km2. The dam impounds about 23  ha of land when full and can store 2078 thousand cubic meters of water. The construction of the dam was completed in 1954.

References

Dams in Yamagata Prefecture
1954 establishments in Japan